XHTZ-FM is a radio station on 96.9 FM in Xalapa, Veracruz, Mexico. It is owned by Grupo Avanradio and is known as 96.9 Digital.

History
XHTZ received its concession on February 7, 1974.

References

Radio stations in Veracruz
Radio stations established in 1974
1974 establishments in Mexico